The 1983 UCI Road World Championships took place between 3-4 September 1983 in Altenrhein, Switzerland.

Results

Medal table

External links 
 Men's results
 Women's results
  Results at sportpro.it

 
UCI Road World Championships by year
UCI Road World Championships 1983
1983 in road cycling
Uci Road World Championships, 1983